54 Tay Street is an historic building in Perth, Scotland. Designed by local architect David Smart, the building is Category B listed, dating to 1866. Standing on Tay Street, also with an entrance on South Street, the building was originally the home of the River Tay Purification Board.

The building stands immediately to the east of Greyfriars Burial Ground.

See also
List of listed buildings in Perth, Scotland

References

1866 establishments in Scotland
Tay Street, 54
Category B listed buildings in Perth and Kinross